Adolf Friedrich Johann Butenandt (24 March 1903 – 18 January 1995) was a German biochemist. He was awarded the Nobel Prize in Chemistry in 1939 for his "work on sex hormones." He initially rejected the award in accordance with government policy, but accepted it in 1949 after World War II. He was President of the Max Planck Society from 1960 to 1972. He was also the first, in 1959, to discover the structure of the sex pheromone of silkworms which he named as bombykol.

Biography
Born in Lehe, near Bremerhaven, he started his studies at the University of Marburg. For his PhD he joined the working group of the Nobel laureate Adolf Windaus at the University of Göttingen and he finished his studies with a PhD in chemistry in 1927. His doctoral research was on the chemistry of the insecticidal toxin found in the roots of Derris elliptica which he isolated and characterized. After his Habilitation he became lecturer in Göttingen 1931. He became a professor ordinarius at the Technical University of Danzig 1933–1936. In 1933 Butenandt signed the Vow of allegiance of the Professors of the German Universities and High-Schools to Adolf Hitler and the National Socialistic State. In 1936 he applied for the directorship of the Kaiser Wilhelm Institut (later the Max Planck Institute for Biochemistry) in Berlin-Dahlem while also joining the NSDAP on 1 May 1936 (party member No. 3716562). The earlier director of the Kaiser Wilhelm institute was Carl Neuberg, who had been removed for being a Jew. His work on rotenones was considered useful by the Nazi leadership as it could be useful for controlling lice among soldiers in the trenches. As the head of a leading institute, he applied for government funding on concentrated research labeled kriegswichtig (important for the war), some of which focused on military projects like the improvement of oxygen uptake for high-altitude bomber pilots.

Adolf Windaus and Walter Schöller of Schering gave him the advice to work on hormones extracted from ovaries. This research lead to the discovery of estrone and other primary female sex hormones, which were extracted from several thousand liters of urine. While working as professor in Danzig at the Chemisches Institut he was continuing his works over hormones extracting progesterone in 1934 and testosterone a year later, the research results were along with the synthesis of steroids by Leopold Ružička considered significant enough to be awarded later by Nobel Committee in 1939. In 1940 he was involved in research on a hormone treatment to make long submarine voyages more comfortable for submariners in the Kriegsmarine.

Butenand's involvement with the Nazi regime and various themes of research led to criticism after the war, and even after his death the exact nature of his political orientation during the Nazi era has never been fully resolved. When the institute moved to Tübingen in 1945 he became a professor at the University of Tübingen. In 1956, when the institute relocated to Martinsried, a suburb of Munich, Butenandt became a professor at the University of Munich. He also served as president of the Max Planck Society for the Advancement of Science following Otto Hahn from 1960 to 1972.

Butenandt is credited with the discovery and naming of the silkworm moth pheromone Bombykol in 1959.

Butenandt died in Munich in 1995, at the age of 91. His wife Erika, born in 1906, died in 1995 at 88.

Honours and awards
 1939: Nobel Prize in Chemistry (shared with Leopold Ruzicka) for the identification of the sex hormones, oestrogen, progesterone and androsterone
 1942: War Merit Cross, Second Class (Germany)
1943: War Merit Cross, First Class (Germany)
 1953: Paul Ehrlich and Ludwig Darmstaedter Prize
 1959: Grand Merit Cross with Star and Sash of the Federal Republic of Germany (1959 and 1964)
 1960: Honorary Citizen of the City of Bremerhaven
 1961: Wilhelm Normann Medal of the German Society for Fat Research
 1962: Bavarian Order of Merit
 1962: Pour le Mérite
 1964: Austrian Decoration for Science and Art
 1967: Cultural Award of the City of Munich
 1969: Commander of the French Legion of Honour
 1972: Ordre des Palmes Académiques
 1981: Bavarian Maximilian Order for Science and Art
 1985: Grand Cross of Merit of the Federal Republic of Germany
 1985: Honorary Citizen of the City of Munich
 1994: Grand Gold Decoration for Services to the Republic of Austria
 1951–1992: 31 participations in the Lindau Nobel Laureate Meetings (record)
 Honorary President of the Max Planck Society
 Honorary Doctor of Medicine (MD H.C.)
 Honorary Doctor of Veterinary Medicine (Dr. med.vet. H.C.)
 Honorary Doctor of Science (Dr. rer. Hc)
 Honorary Doctor of Philosophy (Dr. phil. H.C.)
 Honorary Doctor of Science (D.Sc.), University of Leeds, 1961
 Honorary Doctor of Engineering (Dr.-Ing. E.h.)

See also
Androsterone
Conjugated estriol
Epiandrosterone
Pregnenolone

References

Bibliography

External links

 
 1939 Nobel Prize in Chemistry
 Biography
 MPG Biography
 Lindau Nobel Laureate Meetings: Background information on and historical lectures by Adolf Butenandt (mediatheque)

1903 births
1995 deaths
People from Bremerhaven
Nazi Party members
German biochemists
University of Göttingen alumni
Academic staff of the University of Göttingen
University of Marburg alumni
Academic staff of the Humboldt University of Berlin
Academic staff of the University of Tübingen
Academic staff of the Ludwig Maximilian University of Munich
Academic staff of the Gdańsk University of Technology
Max Planck Society people
Members of the Prussian Academy of Sciences
Members of the German Academy of Sciences at Berlin
Members of the Bavarian Academy of Sciences
Foreign Members of the Royal Society
Members of the French Academy of Sciences
German Nobel laureates
Nobel laureates in Chemistry
Grand Crosses 1st class of the Order of Merit of the Federal Republic of Germany
Recipients of the Pour le Mérite (civil class)
Recipients of the Austrian Decoration for Science and Art
Commandeurs of the Légion d'honneur
Recipients of the Grand Decoration for Services to the Republic of Austria
Max Planck Institute directors